is a 1968 Japanese epic kaiju film directed by Ishirō Honda, with special effects directed by Sadamasa Arikawa and supervised by Eiji Tsuburaya. The film, which was produced and distributed by Toho Co., Ltd, is the ninth film in the Godzilla franchise, and features eleven monster characters, including Godzilla, Mothra, Rodan, King Ghidorah, Anguirus, and Minilla. The film stars Akira Kubo, Jun Tazaki, Yukiko Kobayashi and Yoshio Tsuchiya.

In the film, humans have achieved world peace by the year 1999, and various giant monsters are confined to an area known as Monsterland. The monsters are freed from the area and are mind-controlled by aliens known as Kilaaks, who send them to attack major cities. When the monsters are freed from the Kilaaks' influence, the aliens send King Ghidorah to challenge the other monsters.

Destroy All Monsters was released theatrically in Japan on August 1, 1968. The film was released by American International Pictures with an English-language dub in the United States on May 23, 1969. Contemporary American reviews were mixed, with praise mainly held for the climactic monster battle. Retrospectively, the film has received more praise, and is considered a favorite among Godzilla fans for its "audacious and simple story", "innovative action sequences", and a "memorably booming" score by Akira Ifukube.

Plot
At the close of the 20th century (1999 in the dub), all of the Earth's kaiju have been collected by the United Nations Science Committee and confined in an area known as Monster Island, located in the Ogasawara island chain. A special control center is constructed underneath the island to ensure that the monsters stay secure and to serve as a research facility to study them.

When communications with Monster Island are suddenly and mysteriously severed, and all of the monsters begin attacking world capitals, Dr. Yoshida of the UNSC orders Captain Yamabe and the crew of his spaceship, Moonlight SY-3, to investigate Ogasawara. There, they discover that the scientists, led by Dr. Otani, have become mind-controlled slaves of a feminine alien race identifying themselves as the Kilaaks, who reveal that they are in control of the monsters. Their leader demands that the human race surrender, or face total annihilation.

Godzilla attacks New York City, Rodan invades Moscow, Mothra lays waste to Beijing, Gorosaurus destroys Paris (although Baragon was credited for its destruction), and Manda attacks London. These attacks were set in to motion to draw attention away from Japan, so that the aliens can establish an underground stronghold near Mount Fuji in Japan. The Kilaaks then turn their next major attack onto Tokyo and, without serious opposition, become arrogant in their aims until the UNSC discover, after recovering the Kilaaks' monster mind-control devices from around the world, that they have switched to broadcasting the control signals from their base under the Moon's surface. In a desperate battle, the crew of the SY-3 destroys the Kilaak's lunar outpost and returns the alien control system to Earth.

With all of the monsters under the control of the UNSC, the Kilaaks call King Ghidorah. The three-headed space dragon is dispatched to protect the alien stronghold at Mount Fuji, and battles Godzilla, Minilla, Mothra, Rodan, Gorosaurus, Anguirus, and Kumonga. While seemingly invincible, King Ghidorah is eventually overpowered by the combined strength of the Earth monsters and is killed. Refusing to admit defeat, the Kilaaks produce their ace, a burning monster they call the Fire Dragon, which begins to torch Tokyo and destroys the control center on Ogasawara. Suddenly, Godzilla attacks and destroys the Kilaaks' underground base, revealing that the Earth's monsters instinctively know who their enemies are. Captain Yamabe then pursues the Fire Dragon in the SY-3 and narrowly achieves victory for the human race. The Fire Dragon is revealed to be a flaming Kilaak saucer and is destroyed. With the Kilaaks defeated, Godzilla and the other monsters eventually return to Monster Island to live in peace.

Cast

Production

Writing
Special effects director Sadamasa Arikawa noted that Toho were going to potentially end the Godzilla series as "Producer Tanaka figured that all the ideas had just run out." Several sources attest that the film was announced alongside Son of Godzilla, possibly as a competing project.

The film was written by Takeshi Kimura and Ishirō Honda, making it the first Godzilla film since Godzilla Raids Again not written by Shinichi Sekizawa. Takeshi Kimura is credited to the pen name Kaoru Mabuchi in the film's credits. Kimura and Honda's script developed the concept of Monsterland (referred to as Monster Island in future films).

The earliest screenplay, written by Kimura in 1967, was titled Monster Chushingura (怪獣忠臣蔵, Kaiju Chūshingura). (The word chushingura refers to a famous historical story in Japan about the rebellion of 47 samurai who took revenge after their master was unjustly forced to commit suicide). Supposedly, in this version, every monster in Toho’s arsenal was to be included, even King Kong, Sanda, and Gaira. In an interview with David Miller, Ishiro Honda even said “The original idea was to show all of the monsters.”

The first initial screenplay, preliminary titled Monster Total Advancement Order (怪獣総進撃命令, Kaijū Sōshingeki Meirei), by Takashi Kamura (as Kaoru Mabuchi) was submitted on November 22, 1967, included a confirmed roster of Godzilla, Mothra (larva), King Ghidorah, Rodan, Baragon, Varan, Kumonga, Manda, Maguma, and Ebirah. Everything plays out just as in the finished film except that Maguma and Baragon guard the Kilaak base and Baragon actually attacks Paris. Also, in this iteration, Varan and Rodan work in tandem to attack King Ghidorah in the final battle.

When it was decided to adapt Two Godzillas!: Japan SOS (an earlier version of Son of Godzilla) instead, the script was shelved for next year, by then the rights to Kong had expired. Ishiro Honda also wanted to show lunar colonies and brand new hybrid monsters, the results of interbreeding and genetic splicing. He also wanted to delve more deeply into undersea farming to feed the monsters. But because of budget constraints he couldn't show all this. In later scripts, the number of monsters was cut as well.

Filming
Director Ishiro Honda was fascinated by the concept of a "monster farm", in particular the idea of how humanity could feed them. He noted that a "huge amount of protein" would be needed and envisioned cloning along with undersea farming to accomplish this. However, despite the director's fascination with this concept, the final movie devotes very little time to it outside of the brief introduction to Monsterland and showing Rodan feasting on a dolphin. The director laments that of the original complex idea only the basic "idea of [a] Monster Island survived."

As the film has several monsters who continuously return in the films, the location was developed to be a faraway island where the monsters are pacified. This tied other films not related to the Godzilla series within its universe, as creatures such as Manda (from Atragon) and Varan (Varan the Unbelievable) exist. The film features footage from Ghidorah, the Three-Headed Monster (1964), specifically King Ghidorah's fiery birth scene.

Like with Godzilla vs. the Sea Monster (1966), Teisho Arikawa was the actual special effects director for the movie, although Eiji Tsuburaya is credited for it. However, Tsuburaya had more of a supervisor role regarding the special effects.

During the monster’s attack on Tokyo, you can see Godzilla steps over a construction crane model. Looking back on it, Haruo Nakajima did so because he was worried he might trip over it and fall. He regretted doing that since he should have kicked it out of the way since it was a very non-monster like thing to do.

Eiji Tsuburaya was always getting letters from kids asking to see a real monster. So, he arranged for Toho to invite to the studio around 100 kids who would be entering first grade. In Japan, entrance into grade school involves a special ceremony to welcome the kids, so this lucky bunch got to see all the monsters on the set rather than endure the usual boring speeches from school officials. On March 26, 1968, the kids assembled at the Mt Fuji set in Stage 11 and were entertained by all 11 monsters and they were also greeted by stars Akira Kubo and Jun Tazaki.

In spring of 1968, while Destroy all Monsters was in production, the Imperial Theater of London was staging a production Oliver in Tokyo and one of the plays child stars known only as Michael was a big Godzilla fan and he wanted to visit Toho. But he couldn't because his commitment to the play wouldn't allow him. Toho surprised him with a visit from the monsters and actress Yukiko Kobayashi.

At the climatic battle at Mt. Fuji, Haruo Nakajima wanted Godzilla to reprise his “jumping shie” from Invasion of Astro Monster (1965), but Ishiro Honda removed it from the final film.

Special effects
New monster suits for Godzilla and Anguirus were constructed for the film, while Rodan, Kumonga, Minilla, Gorosaurus, Manda, Baragon, Mothra, and King Ghidorah suits were modified from previous films, with King Ghidorah having less detail than he had in previous films.

There were 3 different scales of the Moonlight SY-3 created or the film. The largest was 1 meter (3 feet) long used mainly used for shots of the spaceship flying across the surface of the moon, landing and taking off, and for battle with the Fire Dragon (UFO). The core of the model was solid wood with surface details made of balsa wood and molded fiber glass with puddy and paint used to disguise the wood grain and the seams. This model had collapsible wings, functional landing gear and fully firing engines. A 50 cm version was made for use for the booster stage and a 30 cm version was made for perspective flying shots. Both smaller versions were made of balsa wood covered in putty and paint.

For the scene when Gorosaurus comes out of the ground (through a tunnel presumably dug by Baragon) under the Arc de Triomphe, the floor of the set was six and half feet above the ground with the arc built on top of it. A forklift was brought in under the set and the monster was put on the forklift. They then raised the monster up through the ground by raising the forklift.

The fire trap set by the Kilaaks to trap the Moonlight SY-3 used real flamethrowers. Fire retardant materials were used in the rock walls in the crater.

Release

Box office

Destroy All Monsters was released in Japan on 1 August 1968 where it was distributed by Toho. It was released on a double bill with a reissue of the film Atragon. The film had a budget of roughly ¥200,000,000 yen and received an attendance of 2,580,000. The film was reissued theatrically in Japan in 1972 where it was re-edited by Honda to a 74-minute running time and released with the title Godzilla: Lightning Fast Strategy (ゴジラ電撃大作戦, Gojira Dengeki Daisakusen). Destroy All Monsters continued the decline in ticket sales in Japan for the Godzilla series, earning 2.6 million in ticket sales. In comparison, Invasion of Astro-Monster brought in 3.8 million and Son of Godzilla collected 2.5 million.

US release
The film was released in the United States by American International Pictures with an English-language dub on 23 May 1969. The film premiered in the United States in Cincinnati. American International Pictures hired Titra Studios to dub the film into English. The American version of the film remains relatively close to the Japanese original. Among the more notable removed elements include Akira Ifukube's title theme and a brief shot of Minilla shielding his eyes and ducking when King Ghidorah drops Anguirus from the sky. Destroy All Monsters was shown on American television until the early 1980s. It resurfaced on cable broadcast on the Sci-Fi Channel in 1996.

Home media
Destroy All Monsters was released on VHS by ADV Films in 1998 which featured English-dubbed dialogue from Toho's own international version of the film. In 2011, Tokyo Shock released the film on DVD and Blu-ray and in 2014 the company re-released it on DVD and Blu-ray. In 2019, the Japanese version and export English version were included in a Blu-ray box set released by the Criterion Collection, which included all 15 films from the franchise's Shōwa era.

In 2021, Toho premiered a 4K remaster of the film on the Nippon Classic Movie Channel, along with seven other Godzilla films also remastered in 4K. The film was downscaled to 2K for broadcast.

Critical response
From contemporary reviews, both Variety and Monthly Film Bulletin noted the film's best scenes involved the monsters together, while criticising the filmmaking. Variety reviewed the English-dubbed version of the film stating that it may appeal to "Sci-fi addicts and monster fans" while stating that the "plot is on comic strip level, special effects depend on obvious miniatures and acting (human) is from school of Flash Gordon" and that the film's strength relied on its "monster rally". The Monthly Film Bulletin opined that "the model work is poor, and as usual the script is junior comic-strip". Both reviews mentioned the monsters' final scene with Variety commenting that it was "clever" and the Monthly Film Bulletin stating that "apart from [the monsters] statutory devastation of world capitals [...] the monsters have disappointingly little to do until they get together in the last reel for a splendid battle" The Monthly Film Bulletin commented that the film was "almost worth sitting through the banalities for the final confrontation on Mount Fuji" noting the son of Godzilla "endearingly applauding from a safe distance" and "the victorious monsters performing a celebratory jig".

From retrospective reviews, Steve Biodrowski of Cinefantastique commented that the film "is too slim in its storyline, too thin in its characterizations, to be considered a truly great film [...] But for the ten-year-old living inside us all, it is entertainment of the most awesome sort." Matt Paprocki of Blogcritics said the film is "far from perfect" and "can be downright boring at times" but felt that "the destruction scenes make up for everything else" and "the final battle is an epic that simply can't be matched".

The film is considered a cult favorite among fans of the Godzilla franchise. In Steve Ryfle and Ed Godziszewski's 2017 book covering Ishiro Honda's filmography, they expressed that Destroy All Monsters is now seen as the "last truly spirited entry" in Toho's initial series of kaiju films, due to "its audacious and simple story, a bounty of monsters and destruction, and a memorably booming soundtrack from Akira Ifukube".

Godzilla director Gareth Edwards previously expressed interest in making a sequel to his 2014 movie inspired by Destroy All Monsters.

See also

List of Japanese films of 1968
List of science fiction films of the 1960s

References
Notes

Sources

External links

1968 films
1960s science fiction films
1960s fantasy films
1960s monster movies
ADV Films
Alien invasions in films
American International Pictures films
Crossover tokusatsu films
Films scored by Akira Ifukube
Films about dragons
Films about extraterrestrial life
Films about spiders
Films about the United Nations
Films directed by Ishirō Honda
Films dubbed by Frontier Enterprises
Films produced by Tomoyuki Tanaka
Films set in 1999
Films set in Moscow
Films set in New York City
Films set in Paris
Films set in the future
Films set in Tokyo
Films set in Yamanashi Prefecture
Godzilla films
1960s Japanese-language films
Japanese science fiction films
Japanese sequel films
Kaiju films
Moon in film
Mothra
Pterosaurs in fiction
Toho films
1960s Japanese films
Films about mind control